Lukas Jørgensen (born 31 March 1999) is a Danish handball player for GOG Håndbold and the Danish national team.

From summer 2023 he has a contract with SG Flensburg-Handewitt.

Achievements
Danish Handball League: 
Winner: 2022 
Danish Handball Cup: 
Winner: 2022

Individual awards
 MVP of the Danish Handball Cup Final four 2022

References

External links

1999 births
Living people
Danish male handball players